Doro Gia Sena (Greek: Δώρο Για Σένα; English: A Present For You) is the fourth studio album by the popular Greek singer Nikos Oikonomopoulos. The album was released on 3 December 2010 and is his first album with Minos EMI. It was certified platinum in its first week in the Greek Albums Chart.

Track listing
"Ximeronei" (Ξημερώνει; Dawning) - 3:16
"Doro Gia Sena" (Δώρο Για Σένα; A Present For You) - 3:20
"Den Eimai Kanenos" (Δεν Είμαι Κανενός; I'm Not A Nobody) - 3:40
"Alla Mou Taxane" (Άλλα Μου Τάξανε; I Was Promised A Lot) - 4:40
"Pare Me Mazi Sou" (Πάρε Με Μαζί Σου; Take Me With You) - 4:29
"Den Eimai Kala" (Δεν Είμαι Καλά; I'm Not Fine) - 3:23
"Den Me Noiazei Poia Isoun" (Δεν Με Νοιάζει Ποια Ήσουν; I Don't Care What You Were) - 3:38
"Simeiosate Diplo..." (Σημειώσατε Διπλό...; Note Double...) - 3:21
"Tha Me Vriskeis Brosta Sou" (Θα Με Βρίσκεις Μπροστά Σου; You Will Find Me Before You) - 3:42
"Mia Kardia Ston Anemo" (Μια Καρδιά Στον Άνεμο; One Heart In Wind) - 4:26
"Dos Mou Ti Zoi Mou Piso" (Δως Μου Τη Ζωή Μου Πίσω; Give Me Back My Life) - 4:43
"Trelos Ki Anapodos Kairos" (Τρελός Κι Ανάποδος Καιρός; Crazy And Untoward Weather) - 4:11
"I Agapi Einai Tragoudi (featuring Stamatis Gonidis)" (Η Αγάπη Είναι Τραγούδι;The Love Is Song) - 3:26

Chart performance 
The album achieved platinum certification from its first week and eventually was three times platinum.

References

2010 albums
Nikos Oikonomopoulos albums
Greek-language albums
Minos EMI albums